This is a list of contestants who have appeared on the television series, The Amazing Race: China Rush. Contestants with a pre-existing relationship form a team and race across China against other teams to claim a trip around the world. In total, 42 contestants have appeared in the series.

Contestants
The presented information was accurate at the time of filming.

References
Official Site

Amazing Race: China Rush contestants, The